Nuts for Love is a 2000 Argentine drama film, directed by Alberto Lecchi.

Cast 
 Ariadna Gil - Alicia
 Gastón Pauls - Marcelo
  - Alicia de joven / Cecilia
 Nicolás Pauls - Marcelo de joven
 Nancy Dupláa - Claudia
 Gabriel Goity - Médico
  - Armando

References

External links 

2000 drama films
2000 films
Films directed by Alberto Lecchi
Argentine drama films
2000s Argentine films
2000s Spanish-language films